Nasdaq, Inc. is an American multinational financial services corporation that owns and operates three stock exchanges in the United States: the namesake Nasdaq stock exchange, the Philadelphia Stock Exchange, and the Boston Stock Exchange, and seven European stock exchanges: Nasdaq Copenhagen, Nasdaq Helsinki, Nasdaq Iceland, Nasdaq Riga, Nasdaq Stockholm, Nasdaq Tallinn, and Nasdaq Vilnius. It is headquartered in New York City, and its president and chief executive officer is Adena Friedman.

Historically, the European operations have been known by the company name OMX AB (Aktiebolaget Optionsmäklarna/Helsinki Stock Exchange), which was created in 2003 upon a merger between OM AB and HEX plc. The operations have been part of Nasdaq, Inc. (formerly known as Nasdaq OMX Group) since February 2008. They are now known as Nasdaq Nordic, which provides financial services and operates marketplaces for securities in the Nordic and Baltic regions of Europe.

History

Background

1980–2008: European bourses merged in OMX AB

OM AB (Optionsmäklarna) was a futures exchange founded by Olof Stenhammar in the 1980s to introduce trading in standardized option contracts in Sweden. OM acquired the Stockholm Stock Exchange in 1998 and unsuccessfully attempted acquisition of the London Stock Exchange in 2001. During the dot-com bubble in the early 21st century, OM, together with investment bank Morgan Stanley Dean Witter, launched a virtual European stock exchange called Jiway. The project was not successful and was canceled on October 14, 2002.

On September 3, 2003, the Helsinki Stock Exchange (HEX) merged with OM, and the joint company became OMHEX. On August 31, 2004, the brand name of the company was changed to OMX. OMX then acquired the Copenhagen Stock Exchange in January 2005 for €164 million. On September 19, 2006, the Iceland Stock Exchange owner Eignarhaldsfelagid Verdbrefathing (EV) announced it would be acquired by OMX in a deal valuing the company at 250 million SEK. The transaction was completed by the end of the year.

The company took a 10% stake in Oslo Børs Holding ASA, the owner of the Oslo Stock Exchange in October 2006. As of September 2016, Nasdaq is not a major shareholder in the Oslo Stock Exchange holding company, which following a merger is currently called Oslo Børs VPS Holding ASA. Nasdaq has, however, publicly stated its interest in eventually acquiring the Oslo Stock Exchange.

In November 2007, OMX acquired the Armenian Stock Exchange and the Central Depository of Armenia.

In December 2005, OMX started First North, an alternative exchange for smaller companies, in Denmark. The First North exchange expanded to Stockholm in June 2006, Iceland in January 2007 and Helsinki in April 2007. The Markets Technology division of Computershare was acquired in 2006. The acquisition greatly expanded its product offerings and made its client list the largest of all trading system technology providers.

On October 2, 2006, the group launched a virtual Nordic Stock Exchange after merging the individual lists of shares traded at its three wholly owned Nordic exchanges into a combined Nordic List. Companies listed on the Iceland Stock Exchange have also since been merged into the list. OMX also launched a pan-regional benchmark index known as the OMX Nordic 40 on the same date; however, the individual exchanges have also retained their own national benchmark indices.

1971–2008: NASDAQ

2006-2007: Attempted acquisition of the London Stock Exchange 
In December 2005, the London Stock Exchange Group (LSE) rejected a £1.6 billion takeover offer from Macquarie Bank. The LSE described the offer as "derisory". It then received a bid in March 2006 for £2.4 billion from NASDAQ, which was also rejected by the LSE. NASDAQ later pulled its bid, and less than two weeks later on April 11, 2006, struck a deal with LSE's largest shareholder, Ameriprise Financial's Threadneedle Asset Management unit, to acquire all of that firm's stake, consisting of 35.4 million shares, at £11.75 per share. NASDAQ also purchased 2.69 million additional shares, resulting in a total stake of 15%. While the seller of those shares was undisclosed, it occurred simultaneously with a sale by Scottish Widows of 2.69 million shares. The move was seen as an effort to force LSE to negotiate either a partnership or eventual merger, as well as to block other suitors such as NYSE Euronext, owner of the New York Stock Exchange.

Subsequent purchases increased NASDAQ's stake to 29%, holding off competing bids for several months. However, only a further 0.4% of shareholders accepted the offer by the deadline and therefore the offer was rejected on February 10, 2007.

2007: Acquisition of the Boston and Philadelphia exchanges
On October 2, 2007, Nasdaq purchased the Boston Stock Exchange. On November 7, Nasdaq announced an agreement to purchase the Philadelphia Stock Exchange.

2007: Creation

On May 25, 2007, NASDAQ agreed to buy OMX for US$3.7 billion. In August, however, Borse Dubai offered US$4 billion, prompting speculation of a bidding war. On September 20, 2007, Borse Dubai agreed to stop competing to buy OMX in return for a 20% stake and 5 percent of votes in NASDAQ as well as NASDAQ's then 28% stake in the London Stock Exchange. In a complex transaction, Borse Dubai acquired 97.2% of OMX's outstanding shares before selling them on to NASDAQ. The newly merged company was renamed the NASDAQ OMX Group upon completion of the deal on February 27, 2008.

On June 18, 2012, NASDAQ became a founding member of the United Nations Sustainable Stock Exchanges initiative on the eve of the United Nations Conference on Sustainable Development (Rio+20).

2012: Acquisition of Thomson Reuters businesses
On December 12, 2012, NASDAQ OMX announced that it would acquire Thomson Reuters' investor relations, public relations and multimedia businesses for $390 million in cash. NASDAQ OMX completed the purchase on June 3, 2013.

2017: Launch of Nasdaq Ventures
In April 2017, Nasdaq launched Nasdaq Ventures, a venture investment program focused on companies that will help Nasdaq grow its product lines and open new market segments. The first 3 companies announced as part of the program are Chain, a blockchain technology company; Digital Reasoning, cognitive computing technology; and Hanweck, real-time risk analytics.

2018: Bid for Oslo Stock Exchange
During Christmas of 2018, shareholders representing 25% of Oslo Børs VPS Holding (the Norwegian Stock Exchange and national CSD operator) held a private auction of share sale. Nasdaq did not participate in the auction due to the hostile nature of the bid (held without Oslo Børs boards knowledge or approval). Euronext won the auction, and later secured another 24.6% of shareholder support, totaling 49.6%. Following this, Nasdaq acquired 32.5% shares in open market (mainly from individual shareholders/employees), and submitted an official bid, with unanimous recommendations from board and some key shareholders, to acquire remaining shares for 152 NOK, and later increased offer to 158 NOK (or almost 44% premium of December 17, 2018 closing price, to match Euronext offer), additionally making the case to Norway's markets regulator that in cases like this, 2/3 of the share control may be necessary to comply with any applicable regulatory requirement. In the end the regulator did not side with the two-thirds requirements, and general majority was deemed to be applicable. Euronext by that time had acquired or secured control of 50.5% shares, and Nasdaq had announced on May 25, 2019 that they were pulling out of the Oslo Børs battle, handing Euronext the victory.

Additional services
NASDAQ Inc. partners with stock exchanges all over the world. One of the most recent partnerships was signed with Astana International Financial Centre (AIFC) in May 2017. According to the agreement, NASDAQ will power Kazakhstan's nascent stock exchange, the AIX (Astana International Exchange) .

Global Information Services
In January 2013, NASDAQ OMX announced that it would combine its global data products and index businesses into a unit called Global Information Services, as part of an ongoing effort to broaden its portfolio.

Directors Desk
On June 29, 2007, NASDAQ entered into an agreement to acquire DirectorsDesk.com, a management suite for boards of directors.

GlobeNewswire
GlobeNewswire (previously PrimeNewswire) provides press release, editing and wire services. It was founded in 1998 and acquired by NASDAQ OMX in 2006. It was sold to Intrado in April 2018.

SMARTS
On July 27, 2010, NASDAQ OMX Group, Inc. acquired SMARTS Group, a provider of market surveillance systems to exchanges, regulators and brokers. SMARTS Group had been a private company operating in Sydney, Australia, incorporating the market analysis software of Michael James Aitken. By 2017 SMARTS remained the leading market surveillance software, and was employed by thirteen regulators on forty-five exchanges.

Carpenter Moore
NASDAQ OMX sold its stake in the Carpenter Moore D&O Insurance in 2009.

Exchanges

The following exchanges are operated by Nasdaq, Inc.:
Nasdaq (New York)
Nasdaq Copenhagen
Nasdaq Stockholm
Nasdaq Helsinki
Nasdaq Iceland
Nasdaq Tallinn
Nasdaq Riga
Nasdaq Vilnius
Nasdaq Philadelphia
Nasdaq Boston

Divisions
The company's stock market activities are categorized into three divisions:
Nordic Market (Copenhagen, Stockholm, Helsinki, Iceland)
Baltic Market (Tallinn, Riga, Vilnius)
First North (alternative exchange)

Technology
In North America, OMX supports its most high-profile customers such as the Financial Industry Regulatory Authority (FINRA), ICAP, ISE, and IDCG, which are powered by OMX trading systems such as X-stream, CLICK, CONDICO and SAXESS.

OMX is the world's leading provider of central securities depository (CSD) technology. Its Equator CSD product is used by clients in Europe, the Middle East, Africa and the Caribbean.

Central counterparty clearing (CCC) technology is a significant potential growth area for OMX. OMX's SECUR clearing and Genium trading platform facilitate trade novation, derivatives clearing, risk management and improved liquidity. SECUR clearing and Genium trading technology are in production around the world.

OMX's technology customers include:

Abu Dhabi Securities Exchange
Agora-X
Athens Exchange
Australian Securities Exchange
Bahamas International Securities Exchange
Bahrain Stock Exchange
Barbados Stock Exchange
Bermuda Stock Exchange
Bolsa de Valores de Colombia
Boston Stock Exchange
Canadian Trading and Quotation System
Egyptian Exchange
Doha Securities Market
Dubai Financial Market
Dubai International Financial Exchange
Financial Industry Regulatory Authority
Hong Kong Exchanges and Clearing
ICAP
Icelandic Securities Depository
Indonesia Securities Exchange
Iraq Stock Exchange
Istanbul Stock Exchange
Indonesia Stock Exchange
Jamaica Stock Exchange
Japan Next
Malta Stock Exchange
Moscow Interbank Currency Exchange
National Stock Exchange of Australia
New Zealand Exchange
Nigerian Stock Exchange
NSX Corporate Stock Exchange
Osaka Securities Exchange
Palestine Securities Exchange
Philippine Dealing and Exchange Corporation
PLUS Markets Group
Port Moresby Stock Exchange
Saudi Arabia Stock Exchange (Tadawul)
Singapore Commodity Exchange
Singapore Exchange
Shanghai Stock Exchange
SWX Swiss Exchange
Thailand Futures Exchange
TLX
Tokyo Commodity Exchange
Trinidad and Tobago Stock Exchange
Turkish Derivatives Exchange
Zagreb Stock Exchange

See also

List of stock exchanges
List of European stock exchanges
List of Danish companies
List of Finnish companies
List of Faroese companies
List of Greenlandic companies
List of Icelandic companies
List of Swedish companies
List of Ålandic companies

References

External links 
 

2008 mergers and acquisitions
2002 initial public offerings
 
Companies based in Manhattan
Financial services companies based in New York City
Multinational companies based in New York City
Publicly traded companies based in New York City